
Gmina Brudzeń Duży is a rural gmina (administrative district) in Płock County, Masovian Voivodeship, in east-central Poland.

The gmina contains part of the protected area called Brudzeń Landscape Park.

Villages
Gmina Brudzeń Duży contains the villages and settlements of Bądkowo Jeziorne, Bądkowo Kościelne, Bądkowo-Podlasie, Bądkowo-Rochny, Bądkowo-Rumunki, Biskupice, Brudzeń Duży, Brudzeń Mały, Cegielnia, Cierszewo, Główina, Gorzechowo, Izabelin, Janoszyce, Karwosieki-Cholewice, Karwosieki-Noskowice, Kłobukowo-Patrze, Krzyżanowo, Lasotki, Łukoszyno-Borki, Murzynowo, Myśliborzyce, Nowe Karwosieki, Parzeń, Parzeń-Janówek, Radotki, Rembielin, Robertowo, Rokicie, Siecień, Siecień Rumunki, Sobowo, Strupczewo Duże, Suchodół, Turza Mała, Turza Wielka, Uniejewo, Więcławice, Wincentowo, Winnica, Zdziembórz and Żerniki.

Neighbouring gminas
Gmina Brudzeń Duży is bordered by the gminas of Dobrzyń nad Wisłą, Gozdowo, Mochowo, Nowy Duninów, Stara Biała, Tłuchowo and Włocławek.

References
Polish official population figures 2006

Brudzen Duzy
Płock County